Stedman may refer to:
 Stedman (name)
 Stedman, North Carolina
 Stedman's Medical Dictionary
 Stedman Machine Company
 Battle of Fort Stedman
 Stedman barb, a species of cyprinid fish native to India and Bangladesh
 Stedman v United Kingdom, 1997 UK labour law case
 Stedmans V&S, Canadian department store
 Stedman, a popular method in Change ringing

See also  
Steadman (disambiguation)
Steedman (disambiguation)